Izair Emini (Izo) (Macedonian Cyrillic: Изаир Емини; born 4 October 1985) is an ethnic Albanian football player from the Republic of North Macedonia who plays for FK Voska Sport in the Kosovo as a striker.

Club career

Renova
During the 2014–15 season, Emini was the top goalscorer with 20 goals, with Renova who qualified in the 2015–16 UEFA Europa League first qualifying round.

Kukësi
Emini joined Albanian Superliga side Kukësi on 7 January 2016 on a free transfer, signing an initial 6-month contract with the option of a further two years. During the presentation, he was handed the squad number 8.

2015–16 season
He made his debut for the team on 23 January in the first leg of 2015–16 Albanian Cup's quarter-final against Teuta Durrës, where he played full-90 minutes in a 1–0 away lose. Eight days later, in his league debut, Emini scored twice, including a 22nd minute free kick goal in an eventual 3–0 home win versus Bylis Ballsh, becoming quickly a fan favourite. On 13 February, Emini was on the scoresheet again as he scored during the 2–2 home draw against the Europe rivals of Teuta Durrës, taking his tally up to 3 goals in 3 matches.

In March, Emini enjoyed a prolific form, scoring the winners against both Laçi and Tërbuni Pukë, being vital in the club's race for European competitions. On 18 May, in the final day of the league, Emini he scored both goals, both long-range strikes, in the 2–1 home win against Tirana to secure his side a spot in the UEFA Europa League for the next season.

Four days later, in the 2016 Albanian Cup Final against Laçi, Emini started and played 120 minutes in the 1–1 draw; the match went to penalty shootouts where Emini successfully converted his penalty shootout attempt to help the team win 5–3 for the first trophy in the club's history. Emini ended his first season with Kukësi by scoring 11 goals, including 10 in league, in 23 appearances, including 18 in league, as Kukësi finished the season in third position.

2016–17 season
Emini started the new season by playing in the two-legged match against Rudar valid for the first qualifying round of Europa League, as Kukësi progressed to the next round with the aggregate 2–1. In the next round, the team faced Austria Wien. In the first leg, with Kukësi down 1–0, Emini missed a clear opportunity with an empty goal in the last minute, leaving the score unchanged. In the returning leg, Emini did not prevent the 4–1 defeat at Elbasan Arena as Kukësi was knocked out of the Europa League with the aggregate 5–1.

Emini begun the domestic season on 24 August by playing in the 2016 Albanian Supercup against Skënderbeu Korçë, scoring the second Kukësi goal in an eventual 3–1 win at the Selman Stërmasi Stadium, aiding the club to win its first ever Albanian Supercup trophy. On 24 September, during the goalless draw at Laçi, Emini suffered a leg injury that kept him sidelined for a month. He returned in training in last days of October, and played his first match against Dinamo Tirana for the Albanian Cup's first round, contributing with a goal in a 2–0 success. Three days later, Emini scored the winner against Luftëtari Gjirokastër in the last match of the first phrase of the league helping Kukësi to remain the only team without a loss.

Career statistics

Honours

Club
FK Shkëndija
Macedonian First League (1): 2010–11
Macedonian Super Cup (1): 2011

FK Kukësi
 Albanian Cup: 2015–16
 Albanian Supercup: 2016
 Albanian Superliga: 2016–17

Individual
Macedonian First League top goalscorer (1): 2014–15
Macedonian Second League (West) top goalscorer (1): 2021-2022

References

External links
 
 

1985 births
Living people
Sportspeople from Tetovo
Albanian footballers from North Macedonia
Association football forwards
Macedonian footballers
KF Shkëndija players
FK Renova players
FK Kukësi players
FC Drita players
Macedonian First Football League players
Kategoria Superiore players
Football Superleague of Kosovo players
Macedonian expatriate footballers
Expatriate footballers in Albania
Macedonian expatriate sportspeople in Albania
Expatriate footballers in Kosovo
Macedonian expatriate sportspeople in Kosovo